A Removal Unit (RMU) was a tradable carbon credit or 'Kyoto unit' representing an allowance to emit one tonne of greenhouse gases absorbed by a removal or carbon sink activity in an Annex I country. 

Removal Units were generated and issued by Kyoto Protocol Annex I Parties for carbon absorption by land use, land-use change, and forestry (LULUCF) activities such as reforestation.

Application
Under Article 3.3 of the Kyoto Protocol, Annex I Parties could recognise the biosequestration, the removal of carbon dioxide from the atmosphere by carbon sinks, created by direct human-induced afforestation, reforestation and deforestation since 1990, in determining whether they met their emission reduction commitments under the Protocol. When sinks resulted in the net removal of greenhouse gases from the atmosphere, Annex I Parties could issue removal units (RMUs).

See also
Emissions trading
Flexible mechanisms
Assigned amount units
Certified Emission Reduction
Emission Reduction Unit

References
 

Carbon finance
United Nations Framework Convention on Climate Change
Treaties concluded in 1997